Dan Leon Glazer (or Glezer, ; born 20 September 1996) is an Israeli professional footballer who plays as a midfielder for Israeli Premier League club Maccabi Tel Aviv and the Israel national team.

Early life
Glazer was born and raised in Tel Aviv-Yafo, Israel, to an Israeli family of Ashkenazi Jewish (German-Jewish) descent. He is the cousin of fellow Maccabi Tel Aviv academy graduate Daniel Peretz, and the older brother of twin-brothers Tamir Glazer and Amit Glazer, who are all Israeli international footballers as well.

He also holds a German passport, on account of his Ashkenazi Jewish ancestors, which eases the move to certain European football leagues.

International career
Glazer made his international debut for the Israel senior team on 11 September 2018, coming on as a substitute in the 74th minute during a friendly match against Northern Ireland, which finished as a 0–3 away loss.

Career statistics

International

Honours
Maccabi Tel Aviv
 Israeli Premier League: 2018–19, 2019–20
 Israel Toto Cup (Ligat Ha'Al): 2018–19, 2020–21
 Israel Super Cup: 2019, 2020
 Israel State Cup: 2020–21

Individual
 Israeli Footballer of the Year: 2019–20

See also 
 List of Jewish footballers
 List of Jews in sports
 List of Israelis

References

External links
 
 
 
 

1996 births
Living people
Israeli Jews
Israeli Ashkenazi Jews
Footballers from Tel Aviv
Jewish footballers
Israeli footballers
Maccabi Tel Aviv F.C. players
Beitar Tel Aviv Bat Yam F.C. players
Maccabi Netanya F.C. players
Liga Leumit players
Israeli Premier League players
Israel international footballers
Israel under-21 international footballers
Israel youth international footballers
Association football midfielders
Ono Academic College alumni
Israeli Footballer of the Year recipients